IIT Bombay Racing is a Formula Student team from India based at Indian Institute of Technology Bombay since 2007. The team consists of 70 members who aim to conceive, design and fabricate a formula style racecar  through innovation to compete in international Formula Student events.

IIT Bombay Racing made its debut at Formula Student Michigan, 2008 with an entry car Vayu as only Indian team participating in the event. In the following year, the team participated in Formula Student UK, 2009 at Silverstone Circuit with entry car Agni and was 2nd best Asian entry at Formula Student UK. The team also achieved highest score among Indian participating teams along with a 2nd rank in Cost Event.

In the year 2012, IIT Bombay Racing developed Prithvi 3.0 securing 1st in low weight sustainability and won the best car award by peers at the Baja SAE India event held at Pithampur. The same year also witnessed the launch of EVo 1.0, India's first student designed electric racing vehicle.

Since 2012, the team has launched 7 electric vehicles with giant leaps in design and performance. Recently IIT Bombay Racing's 7th electric Racecar EvoK participated in Formula Student UK, 2019.

Team Philosophy
IIT Bombay Racing team has been a unique team being a leading Indian team developing electric race car. The team is driven by a common vision of 'Revolutionizing electric mobility in India focusing on sustainable technologies and innovations'. Bringing electric car technologies in India has been goal of the team for last 5 years. The team has been working besides competition to increase awareness about electric vehicle technologies in Indian society. It has aided many Indian FSAE teams to develop own electric vehicle. The team will further continue to prove power of electric vehicles.

Racing Seasons

Vayu

Vayu was the first car fabricated by IIT Bombay Racing. Vayu participated at FSAE Michigan in 2008. It was the only Indian team participating at the competition. The team won perseverance award and best new entrant award in the competition.

Technical Specifications of Vayu

Agni

Agni participated at FSAE UK in 2009 at Silverstone Circuit, UK. It was 2nd best Asian entry at FSUK competition. The team achieved highest score among participating Indian teams along with 2nd rank in Cost Event and 9th rank in Business Presentation event.

Technical Specifications of Agni

Prithvi 2.0

Prithvi 2.0 was IIT Bombay Racing's second entry in Baja SAE India competition 2009 at Pithampur. It won Raftar award of 1 Lakhs INR for being lightest and fastest vehicle in the competition.

Prithvi 3.0

Prithvi 3.0 was IIT Bombay Racing's third entry in Baja SAE India competition 2012 at Pithampur. Prithvi 3.0 received 1st prize in low weight sustainability as well as received best car award by peers.

EVo 1.0

IIT Bombay Racing launched EVo 1.0 in the same year 2012 as Prithvi 3.0. Being India's first electric race car, it was a breakthrough in Indian Racing history.

Technical Specifications of EVo 1.0

EVo 2.0

EVo 2.0, as a 2nd electric race car developed by IIT Bombay Racing, participated in FSAE UK 2013. EVo 2.0 was first Indian race car to implement electric differential successfully. The team achieved an overall rank of 54th out of 120 teams being top among Indian teams. EVo 2.0 was 1st Indian car to complete all safety checks and participate in dynamic events in competition.

Technical Specifications of EVo 2.0

EVo 3.0

EVo 3.0, as a 3rd electric race car developed by IIT Bombay Racing, participated in FSAE UK 2014. EVo 3.0 was first Indian FS car to complete all static and dynamic events. Also, 1st Indian FS car to qualify for endurance event. EVo 3.0 achieved a rank of 15th among 33 participating electric cars in the event. The team also achieved Formula Student Award of 3000 GBP which is given to only 2 non-UK teams annually.

Technical Specifications of EVo 3.0

EVo 4.0

EVo 4.0, as a 4th consecutive electric race car developed by IIT Bombay Racing, participated in FSAE UK 2015. IIT Bombay Racing fabricated Aluminum honeycomb monocoque chassis which was a feat done first time by an Indian team. The team achieved Formula Student Award of 3000 GBP which is given to only 2 non-UK teams annually.

Technical Specifications of EVo 4.0

Orca

Orca, as a 5th electric race car developed by IIT Bombay Racing, participated in FSAE UK 2016. IIT Bombay Racing fabricated Carbon Fiber bodyworks in-house which was done first time by a student team at IIT Bombay. The team achieved Formula Student Award of 3000 GBP for 3rd time consecutively which is given to only 2 non-UK teams annually. In the event, team completed all static events, and participated in endurance event.

Technical Specifications of Orca

References

External links 

http://indianexpress.com/article/education/iit-b-india-fastest-electric-racing-car-orca-2825209/
https://www.youtube.com/watch?v=WMRcTdSIw0w
http://www.insightiitb.org/2016/full-throttle/
http://www.insightiitb.org/2015/iitb-racings-performance-at-formula-student-15/
http://www.autocarpro.in/news-national/iit-bombay-develops-fifth-electric-racecar-compete-formula-student-uk-20025
http://www.dailyo.in/technology/iit-bombay-racing-formula-electric-car-student-tech-fests/story/1/11449.html
http://www.thehindu.com/news/cities/mumbai/iit-bombay-team-unveils-electric-racing-car/article7216205.ece

Formula Student